Mauro Porpora is a paralympic athlete from Italy competing mainly in category T11 sprint events.

Biography
Mauro Porpora competed in the Paralympics in 2000 where as well as doing the T11 200m he was part of the Italian T13 4 × 100 m relay team that won gold medals.

References

External links
 

Paralympic athletes of Italy
Athletes (track and field) at the 2000 Summer Paralympics
Paralympic gold medalists for Italy
Living people
Medalists at the 2000 Summer Paralympics
Year of birth missing (living people)
Paralympic medalists in athletics (track and field)
Italian male sprinters
Visually impaired sprinters
Paralympic sprinters